Maesbury Railway Cutting is a 2 hectare geological Site of Special Scientific Interest between East Horrington and Gurney Slade in Somerset, notified in 1995.

It was part of the Somerset and Dorset Joint Railway.

This is a Geological Conservation Review site because it exposes approximately 135 metres of strata representing the middle and upper Lower Limestone Shales and the basal Black Rock Limestone. Both formations are of early Carboniferous (Courceyan) age.

It lies close to the Iron Age hill fort Maesbury Castle.

Sources
 English Nature citation sheet for the site (accessed 10 August 2006)

External links
 English Nature website (SSSI information)

Sites of Special Scientific Interest in Somerset
Sites of Special Scientific Interest notified in 1995
Railway cuttings in the United Kingdom
Rail transport in Somerset
Geology of Somerset